HMCS Ottawa (DDH 229) was a  that served in the Royal Canadian Navy and later the Canadian Forces from 1956 to 1992. Ottawa was the first bilingual ship to serve in the Canadian navy.

Design and description

The need for the St. Laurent class came about in 1949 when Canada joined NATO and the Cold War was in its infancy. The Royal Canadian Navy (RCN) was assigned responsibility for anti-submarine warfare (ASW) and controlling sea space in the western North Atlantic. The St Laurent class were built to an operational requirement much like that which produced the British Type 12, and were powered by the same machinery plant. The rounded deck-edge forward was adopted to prevent ice forming. The vessels were designed to operate in harsh Canadian conditions. They were built to counter nuclear, biological and chemical attack conditions, which led to a design with a rounded hull, a continuous main deck, and the addition of a pre-wetting system to wash away contaminants. The living spaces on the ship were part of a "citadel" which could be sealed off from contamination for the crew safety. The ships were sometimes referred to as "Cadillacs" for their relatively luxurious crew compartments; these were also the first Canadian warships to have a bunk for every crew member since previous warship designs had used hammocks.

The destroyer escorts had a crew of 12 officers and 237 enlisted.

Armament
The St. Laurent class was fitted with twin /L50 caliber guns in two mounts for engaging both surface and air targets. The ships were also fitted with two single-mounted  guns. The class's anti-submarine armament consisted of a pair of triple-barreled Mk. NC 10 Limbo ASW mortars in a stern well. The stern well had a roller top to close it off from following seas. As with the British Type 12 design, the provision for long-range homing torpedoes (in this case BIDDER [Mk 20E] or the US Mark 35 were included. However, they were never fitted.

Machinery
The vessels of the St. Laurent class had two Babcock & Wilcox water tube boilers installed.

DDH conversion
Following successful trials aboard the frigate  and Ottawa, plans to convert the St. Laurent class took shape. The development of the beartrap, installed in  during her 1962–63 conversion, finalized the concept. By keeping the aircraft secure, the beartrap eliminated the need for deck handling from landing to the hangar, or from hangar to takeoff.

In the conversion to a helicopter-carrying vessel, Ottawa was gutted except for machinery and some forward spaces. The hull was strengthened, fueling facilities for the helicopter and activated fin stabilizers installed. The fin stabilizers were to reduce roll in rough weather during helicopter operations. All seven St Laurents were fitted with helicopter platforms and SQS 504 Variable Depth Sonar (VDS). The single funnel was altered to twin stepped funnels to permit the forward extension of the helicopter hangar. To make room for the helicopter deck, the aft 3-inch mount and one of the Limbos were removed. The two 40 mm guns were also removed.

DELEX program

In the late 1970s, under the Destroyer Life Extension (DELEX) program was commissioned to upgrade ten of the St. Laurent-class ships with new electronics, machinery, and hull upgrades and repairs. However, only enough was done to keep the ships in service into the late 1980s. For the St. Laurents, this meant hull and machinery repairs only.

Construction and career
Ottawa was laid down at Canadian Vickers in Montreal on 8 June 1951, the ship was launched on 29 May 1953. She was commissioned into the RCN on 10 November 1956 and initially carried the hull number DDE 229 as a destroyer escort. In 1957, Ottawa was used as a test ship for helicopter landing trials on a flight deck installed over the rear of the ship.

Ottawa was transferred to the west coast where she joined the Second Canadian Escort Squadron. In March 1961, the same three ships deployed with the United States Navy's Carrier Division 17 off the coast of Hawaii. Ottawa underwent conversion to a destroyer helicopter escort (DDH) at Victoria, British Columbia, performed by Victoria Machinery Depot beginning on 24 May 1963. The ship was officially reclassed with pennant DDH 229 on 21 October 1964. Ottawa recommissioned on 28 October 1964 and re-transferred to the east coast.

On 15 July 1968 she became the first bilingual ship of Maritime Command. Designated a French Language Unit (FLU), this was to provide a primarily French-speaking unit in the navy, comparable to the Royal 22nd Regiment of the Canadian Army. Ottawa remained a FLU until 1 April 1973. In 1976, Ottawa was among the escort for the royal yacht  during a royal visit to Canada and took part in the major NATO naval exercise Teamwork '76. Later in the year, the vessel joined STANAVFORLANT, NATO's standing naval force for two months.

In 1981, while inspecting the boilers of Ottawa, cracks were found in the superheaters. This led to all the other remaining St. Laurent-class destroyers to be taken out of service for precautionary inspections. Repairs were affected within six months. Ottawa was selected by the Canadian Forces for the Destroyer Life Extension (DELEX) program, and underwent the refit from 19 April to 26 November 1982 at her builder, Canadian Vickers. In June–July 1988, the vessel performed a cruise of the St. Lawrence River and the Great Lakes.

From 6–16 June 1991 Ottawa participated in the NATO naval exercise Ocean Safari 91. She was paid off from active service on 31 July 1992 at Halifax. In February 1994, the ship was sold to Global Shipping of Tampa, Florida. She was towed to India and broken up there in 1994.

Ship's bell
The Christening Bells Project at Canadian Forces Base Esquimalt Naval and Military Museum includes information from the ship's bell of HMCS Ottawa which was used for baptism of babies on board ship 1956–1992. The bell is currently held by the CFB Esquimalt Naval & Military Museum, Esquimalt, British Columbia.

References

Notes

Citations

Sources

External links
Canadian Navy of Yesterday & Today: St. Laurent-class destroyer escort

St. Laurent-class destroyers
Cold War destroyers of Canada
1953 ships